Monschau Castle is a castle in the eponymous town of Monschau in the southern part of the Region of Aachen in Germany. It is used today as a youth hostel and in summer as a venue for concerts and operas.

History 
The hill castle is first recorded in 1217 as castrum in Munjoje by Archbishop Engelbert I of Cologne. It was expanded in the middle of the 14th century into a fortress for the counts of Jülich and equipped with mighty ring walls and wall walks. In 1543 troops of Emperor Charles V besieged the site with heavy guns, captured it and plundered it together with the town of  Monschau.

In the early 19th century the French administration declared the castle to be state property and sold it to a private buyer who had the roofs removed in 1836 and 1837 in order to avoid building tax. As a result, the castle fell into ruins until, in the early 20th century, the government of the Rhine province secured and repaired it. After the First World War a youth hostel was opened in the west wing. So Monschau Castle survived as a "youth castle" (Jugendburg). In 1971 Christo and others repackaged the castle as a work of art.

Haller 

Within sight of the castle, on the other side of town, is another fortification, the Haller. It is disputed as to whether it was an outpost of the castle, a detached watchtower or the remains of an older castle site.

Gallery

References

External links 

 
 
 
 

Monschau
Youth in Germany
Aachen (district)
Jugendburg